Henry Ogden Wintermute, Sr. (29 November 1895, Mount Vernon, Ohio – 29 May 1964) was an American writer and historian.

He wrote a biography of minstrel show pioneer Dan Emmett. The book, Daniel Decatur Emmett, was published in 1955. Wintermute collected many of Emmett's effects and manuscripts. After Wintermute's death, these became the property of the Knox County Historical Society in Ohio.

He was for many years editor of the American Antiques Journal.

References

 Sacks, Howard L., and Sacks, Judith (1993). Way up North in Dixie: A Black Family's Claim to the Confederate Anthem. Washington: Smithsonian Institution Press.

1895 births
1964 deaths
20th-century American biographers
20th-century American historians
American male non-fiction writers
American magazine editors
People from Mount Vernon, Ohio
Journalists from Ohio
20th-century American journalists
American male journalists
20th-century American male writers